Stachys minor (syn.  Stachys libanotica var. minor), the little betony, small betony, or dwarf lamb's ear, is a species of flowering plant in the family Lamiaceae, native to southern Turkey. A perennial with showy flowers and a spreading habit, and hardy in USDA zones 6 through 9, it is recommended for borders, edging, rock gardens, and containers.

References

minor
Garden plants of Asia
Endemic flora of Turkey
Plants described in 2012